Klaus Pohl is the name of:

 Klaus Pohl (actor) (1883–1958), Austrian actor
 Klaus Pohl (German actor) (born 1952), German stage and film actor, director and screenwriter, awarded with the Mülheimer Dramatikerpreis 
 Klaus Pohl (wrestler) (born 1941), East German wrestler
 Klaus Pohl (computer scientist) (born 1960), German computer scientist